Mert Yılmaz (born 8 March 1999) is a professional footballer who plays as a defender for Turkish club Ümraniyespor on loan from Antalyaspor. Born in Germany, Yılmaz represents Turkey internationally.

Club career
On 20 July 2022, Yılmaz joined Ümraniyespor on a season-long loan with an option to buy.

Career statistics

References

External links
 
 

1999 births
Living people
Footballers from Berlin
Turkish footballers
Turkey youth international footballers
German footballers
German people of Turkish descent
Association football defenders
Tennis Borussia Berlin players
RB Leipzig players
FC Bayern Munich footballers
FC Bayern Munich II players
Antalyaspor footballers
Bursaspor footballers
Ümraniyespor footballers
Regionalliga players
3. Liga players
Süper Lig players
TFF First League players